Opa is a common East Mediterranean emotional expression. It is frequently used during celebrations such as weddings or traditional dancing. In Greek culture, the expression sometimes accompanies the act of plate smashing. It can also be used to express enthusiasm, shock or surprise, or just after having made a mistake.

Opa is also used in many Balkan countries such as Bulgaria, Romania, Albania, Serbia, Croatia, Bosnia and Herzegovina and North Macedonia as an expression of shock and surprise, or in their traditional folk dances. In Jewish culture, it is used for mazel tov. Arabs in the Eastern Mediterranean sometimes pronounce it as "obah" (in  Arabic, due to the absence of the letter 'p'), and especially use the expression when picking up or playing with children.

Opa also appears in both Brazil and Portugal. A less common variation is "epa". Besides being used as an emotional expression, opa (or epa) can also be used as a way of getting someone's attention (similar to "Hey!" in English). In Romanian (hopa) and Russian culture (опа) it is used during the short phase of concentration on an action (similar to "come on" in English), the expectation of successful process during the action and the subsequent completion of it, for example, when throwing a basketball into the basket, getting off the bike or picking up a child. The use of this expression is popular in most Eastern European countries.

References

External links

Greek words and phrases
Interjections
Articles containing video clips